Coleophora crispella is a moth of the family Coleophoridae that is endemic to Turkey.

References

External links

crispella
Endemic fauna of Turkey
Moths described in 1994
Moths of Asia